Birmingham Ormiston Academy (BOA) is a regional academy for digital, creative and performing arts located in the centre of Birmingham, West Midlands, England.

Birmingham Ormiston Academy is an independent state funded academy for 14- to 19-year-olds, with a curriculum  designed to for those with talents in the specialist subjects. Their motto is "Imagine Everything". Applicants select a pathway, which will occupy the majority of the curriculum time (16 hours); additional subjects and programmes are also available.

The academy admits students from Birmingham, the surrounding metropolitan boroughs and the wider West Midlands region. The school is sponsored by Ormiston Trust and Birmingham City University, and is partnered with Maverick TV, Birmingham Repertory Theatre and the BRIT School, and has also been unofficially referred to as the BRIT school in Birmingham.

As of 1 September 2014 BOA had taken over the running of the Old Rep Theatre on Station Street in Birmingham. The venue was re-launched on 4 September 2014 with a performance showcasing the skills of their students. Amateur and professional companies will still be able to perform at the theatre as well as the school using the venue for lessons, rehearsal space and performances.

Entry
Entry to any pathway is initially by application, then if applicants meet the initial entry criteria they will be invited to an aptitude workshop for their chosen pathway at the school. The pathways offered are Dance, Acting, Musical Theatre, Music, Music Technology, Art and Design, Games Development and New Media, Broadcast and Production. Admission onto a pathway is considered on the basis of the applicants aptitude for their chosen pathway. For Post 16 students once they have been accepted onto their chosen pathway then they are encouraged choose an additional subject to study at A-Level. However, acceptance onto these courses depends on the future student's GCSE results.

References

External links
 Official website

Schools of the performing arts in the United Kingdom
Secondary schools in Birmingham, West Midlands
Academies in Birmingham, West Midlands
Ormiston Academies
Specialist arts colleges in England